Emma Millinda Gillett (July 30, 1852 – January 23, 1927) was an American lawyer and women's rights activist who played a pivotal role in the advancement of legal studies for women. After local law schools refused to admit her because of her sex, she was admitted by Howard University, an historically black university. Yet the Washington College of Law, which she founded in 1898, did not accept people of color until 1950.

Early background
Gillett was born on July 30, 1852, in Princeton, Wisconsin, to Wisconsin homesteaders. She was educated in Girard, Pennsylvania, where her family moved following the death of her father. In 1870, she graduated from Lake Erie College and taught for the following ten years in the Pennsylvania public school system. During her time as a teacher, she became frustrated with the meager wages paid to single women teachers.

After the death of her mother, Gillett's role in the settlement of her estate sparked an interest in law, as well as being a better paying profession. Encouraged by the news of Belva Lockwood, who had become the first female law student at National University in Washington, DC; Gillett moved to Washington in hopes of following in Lockwood's footsteps. Unfortunately, she found that National University had closed its doors to women. Gillette did gain admission at Howard University and graduated in 1882 with an LLB, followed in 1883 with an LLM. She passed the bar in the District of Columbia the same year. She also became first woman to be appointed a notary public by the president of the United States.

Early career

After admission to the bar, she formed a partnership with Watson J. Newton, which continued until the death of Newton in 1913. At one time she was connected with the District Title Insurance Company and was later Vice President of the Realty Appraisal & Title Company.

Educational career
During this time, her colleague and friend, Ellen Spencer Mussey, sought her assistance in the education of women in the field of law. Mussey had been approached in 1895 by Delia Sheldon Jackson, an aspiring attorney, to apprentice her as a student of law. Realizing both the scope of the task and the significance of the opportunity, Mussey sought out the assistance of Gillett. The two opened the first session of the Woman's Law Class on February 1, 1896. The class had an enrollment of three: Jackson and two other women, Nanette Paul and Helen Malcolm.

Within a few years, the program had expanded and several prominent Washington, D.C., attorneys were brought in for assistance. Although Mussey and Gillett had not initially aspired to establish an independent law school, when Columbian College (now George Washington University) refused their request to take on the women they had educated for their final year of education—on grounds that "women did not have the mentality for law"—the two decided to establish a co-educational law school specifically open to women.

Thus, in April 1898, the Washington College of Law– which merged with American University in 1949 – was incorporated in Washington, DC, as the first law school in the world founded by women.

Accomplishments
Gillett helped in the establishment of a women's club, "The Wimondaughsis", in Washington, D.C. With Ellen Spencer Mussey, her colleague and co-founder of the Washington College of Law, Gillett founded the Women's Bar Association of the District of Columbia. Responding to the written invitation issued by Mussey, calling an initial meeting of "an association of women lawyers in the District of Columbia" on May 17, 1917, 29 other women lawyers joined Gillett and Mussey as charter members of the Women's Bar Association of the District of Columbia. At that time, only New York City, Chicago, and Omaha had organized women's bar associations.

Gillett held many additional roles, including Vice President for the District of Columbia of the American Bar Association in 1922; President of the State Suffrage Association of the District; President of the Women's Bar Association in 1921, and at the time of her death was Dean Emeritus of the Washington College of Law and Chairman of the Legal Branch of the National Woman's Party.

Death
Gillett died on January 23, 1927, after contracting pneumonia while confined to her bed after breaking her hip the previous October.

References

1852 births
1927 deaths
American University people
Howard University School of Law alumni
People from Erie County, Pennsylvania
People from Princeton, Wisconsin
19th-century American women lawyers
19th-century American lawyers
Activists from Pennsylvania
Activists from Wisconsin